Terence Rodney Davies (18 October 1933 – 31 July 2022), better known as Terry Davies, was an Australian rower who competed at two Olympic Games.

Davies competed at the 1960 Rome Olympics in the Men's coxless pair and the 1964 Tokyo Olympics in the Men's eight. He won a gold medal at the 1962 Perth Commonwealth Games in the Men's Eights.

References

External links
Profile at Australian Olympic Committee

1933 births
2022 deaths
Australian male rowers
Olympic rowers of Australia
Rowers at the 1960 Summer Olympics
Rowers at the 1964 Summer Olympics
Rowers at the 1962 British Empire and Commonwealth Games
Commonwealth Games gold medallists for Australia
Commonwealth Games medallists in rowing
Medallists at the 1962 British Empire and Commonwealth Games
20th-century Australian people